Mubi (stylized as MUBI; The Auteurs before 2010) is a global streaming platform, production company and film distributor. MUBI produces and theatrically distributes films by emerging and established filmmakers, which are exclusively available on its platform. Additionally, it publishes Notebook, a film criticism and news publication, and provides weekly cinema tickets to selected new-release films through MUBI GO.

MUBI's streaming platform is available in over 190 countries on the web, Android TV, Chromecast, Roku devices, PlayStation, Amazon Fire TV, Apple TV, and LG and Samsung Smart TVs, as well as on mobile devices including iPhone, iPad and Android.

History
The Auteurs was founded in 2007 by Efe Çakarel, who began work on the business model for MUBI after being unable to watch In the Mood for Love online while in a café in Tokyo.

The Criterion Collection began to provide video-on-demand (VOD) in partnership with The Auteurs in 2008.

In 2010, the company adopted the new name "MUBI".

MUBI is a global streaming service, production company and film distributor. A new hand-picked film arrives on the platform every day, each chosen by MUBI’s curators.

In January 2022, MUBI announced the acquisition of The Match Factory, the international production and sales company.

Prior to the 79th Venice International Film Festival world premiere, MUBI entered the TV industry by acquiring The Kingdom Exodus miniseries. They also brought out the first two seasons of the original series in never-before-seen director's cuts.

Podcasts 
In 2021, MUBI launched two original podcasts. An English language podcast called MUBI Podcast produced with Rico Gagliano, and a Spanish language podcast titled MUBI Podcast: Encuentros, produced in collaboration with La Corriente del Golfo, the production house founded by Gael García Bernal and Diego Luna.

MUBI Productions 
MUBI Productions and co-productions include Port Authority (Danielle Lessovitz), Farewell Amor (Ewka Msangi), Our Men (Rachel Lang), Memory (Michel Franco), My First Film (Zia Anger), Bring Them Down (Christopher Andrews) and One Fine Morning (Mia Hansen-Løve).

MUBI Releases
MUBI is also a film distributor. In addition to releasing films on the platform, it started distributing theatrically in the United States and United Kingdom in 2016, and in Latin America and Germany in 2021.

See also 
 Curzon Home Cinema
 Fandor
 FilmStruck
 Indieflix
 Kanopy
 Netflix
 Shudder
 Cinephilia
 The Film Detective
 Tubi
 List of streaming media services
 Vulgar auteurism

References

External links
 

Film websites
Internet properties established in 2007
PlayStation 4 software
Social cataloging applications
Subscription video on demand services